Double layer may refer to:
 Double layer (biospecific), the surface where two different phases of matter are in contact
 Double layer (plasma physics), a structure in a plasma and consists of two parallel layers with opposite electrical charge
 Double layer (surface science), a structure that appears on the surface of an object when it is placed into a liquid
 Double layer forces, which occur between charged objects across liquids
 Double layer potential, a solution of Laplace's equation
 Double layer suturing, two layers of sutures, first in a deep level of a tissue and then at a more superficial level
 DVD+R DL or Double layer, a DVD format